Land is a surname. Notable people with the surname include:

Ailsa Land, professor
Clay D. Land (born 1960), American judge
David Land (1918–1995), English impresario and theatre producer
Edwin H. Land (1909–1991), American scientist and inventor
Frank Land (born 1928), British information systems researcher
Frank S. Land (1890–1959), American founder of Order of DeMolay
Frank William Land (born c. 1961), British mathematician
Greg Land (born c. 1965), American comic book artist
Harold Land (1928–2001), American tenor saxophonist
Heather Land, American comedian
John Henry Land (1918-2011), American judge and politician
Kenneth Land (born 1942), American sociologist
Michael Land (born 1961), American composer and musician
Michael F. Land (born 1942), British neurobiologist
Nick Land (born 1962), British philosopher
Scott Land (born 1962), American puppeteer and actor
Scott Land (DJ), American DJ
Ted J. Land (1936–2018), American politician
Tommy Land (born 1955), American businessman and politician